The 2017 Winton SuperSprint was a motor racing event for the Supercars Championship, held on the weekend of 19 to 21 May 2017. The event was held at the Winton Motor Raceway near Benalla, Victoria and consisted of two races, 120 and 200 kilometres in length. It is the fifth event of fourteen in the 2017 Supercars Championship and hosted Races 9 and 10 of the season.

Background

Driver changes
Taz Douglas returned to Lucas Dumbrell Motorsport having been replaced for the previous round by Matthew Brabham.

This was the second round in which Super2 Series wildcards were allowed to compete in the main class. Shae Davies, James Golding and Macauley Jones were the three drivers to step up for this round.

References

Winton SuperSprint
Winton SuperSprint